Bidzina Samkharadze (born 2 October 1983 in Tbilisi) is a Georgian rugby union player who plays as a scrum-half for professional SuperLiga club Timișoara Saracens.

Clubs career
During his career, Samkharadze played for Locomotive Tbilisi and Armia Tbilisi in Georgia, Walsall RFC in England and mostly in Romania for Farul Constanţa, Știința Baia Mare and Timișoara Saracens.

International career
He has currently 61 caps for Georgia, since his first game at the 14–19 loss to Portugal, on 14 February 2004, in Tbilisi, for the Six Nations B. He has scored 6 tries for the "Lelos", with an aggregate of 30 points. Samkharadze was called for the 2007 Rugby World Cup, playing in four games, and for the 2011 Rugby World Cup, playing in two games. He remained scoreless on both occasions.

References

External links

 
 
 

1983 births
Living people
Rugby union players from Tbilisi
Rugby union players from Georgia (country)
Georgia international rugby union players
Rugby union scrum-halves
RCJ Farul Constanța players
SCM Rugby Timișoara players
CSM Știința Baia Mare players
Expatriate rugby union players from Georgia (country)
Expatriate rugby union players in Romania
Expatriate sportspeople from Georgia (country) in Romania